The FAI (Ford-A Izhorskiy) armoured car was a replacement for the D-8 armoured car, used by the Soviet Union from the early 1930s to early 1940s.

Description
The FAI was built on the chassis of the GAZ-A car, a licensed copy of the American Ford A. This chassis was the major weakness of the FAI. Most commercial car chassis were not powerful enough to move a useful amount of armour or firepower on the battlefield. The Germans were known to get round this particular problem by designing a car chassis that was intended from the outset for both civilian and military vehicles and which was used successfully in at least one German armoured car family of this period. However, armoured cars based on commercial car chassis were, for the most part, road-bound, thinly armoured and lightly armed. The FAI was a typical example of this class of vehicle with a single 7.62 mm DT machine-gun in a revolving turret. The armour was sufficient to stop most shell fragments and small arms fire, but could not withstand any kind of cannon or heavy machine-gun fire. It was also very vulnerable to mines.

The FAI was built in relatively small numbers before being replaced by the very similar BA-20. The early BA-20 had the same vertically sided turret as the FAI. FAIs were employed in the early days of fighting on the Eastern Front in World War II.

The FAI and BA-20 series had a few advanced features. They were of all-welded construction in an era when very few AFVs were welded. Also, they had cork-filled tires to enable them to retain mobility even if the tires were penetrated.

The FAI and BA-20 are often mistaken for each other. The main recognition feature of the FAI is the two dome-shaped armoured covers over the driver and co-driver's stations. The BA-20 had a flat armoured roof in this area instead.

Variants 

 FAI (ФАИ, «Форд-А, Ижорский»). The FAI was built on the chassis of the GAZ A car, a licensed copy of the US Ford A with 40 l fuel tank.
 FAI-M (ФАИ-М, «ФАИ-Модернизированный») - upgraded variant, since 1938. The FAI-M was converted from the chassis of the newer GAZ-M1 car with 60 L fuel tank using spare upper hulls.
 FAI-ZhD (ФАИ-жд, «ФАИ-железнодорожный») - From 1933 on, small numbers (only 9 were made) of FAI-ZhD were produced. FAI-ZhD was a modification for additional railway usage. The speed on rails was 85 km/h forward and 24 km/h reverse. The road speed was 40 km/h. The changing of modes took the crew 30 minutes.
 GAZ-TK (ГАЗ-ТК, «ГАЗ-Трёхосный, Курчевского») - The armoured car was built on the chassis of the GAZ-AAA and equipped with 71-ТК radio. Only one prototype was made in 1934 - 1935.

Users 
 
 Red Army (1933–45)
 Soviet Border Troops - 30 (1935–41)
  Mongolian People's Republic - 15 (since 1936)
  Second Spanish Republic - 20
  - The Germans used at least one captured FAI-M.

References

Sources 
 М. В. Коломиец. Лёгкие бронеавтомобили Красной Армии довоенной постройки ("Фронтовая иллюстрация" № 2 2007). – М.: ООО "Стратегия КМ", 2007.

External links 
 FAI  at Battlefield.ru
 U.S. WWII Newsmap, "Russian Armored Vehicles", hosted by the UNT Libraries Digital Collections

Armoured cars of the interwar period
World War II armoured fighting vehicles of the Soviet Union
Military vehicles introduced in the 1930s
Izhorskiye Zavody products